The Charles and Ibby Whiteside House is a historic house in Corvallis, Oregon, United States. Built from planbooks in 1922 during a period of rapid growth in Corvallis, it is an excellent example of an airplane bungalow, and probably the only house of that style ever constructed in the city. It was added to the National Register of Historic Places in 2007.

See also
National Register of Historic Places listings in Benton County, Oregon
Whiteside Theatre

References

Houses in Corvallis, Oregon
Houses on the National Register of Historic Places in Oregon
National Register of Historic Places in Benton County, Oregon
Bungalow architecture in Oregon